Lingojigudem is a village in Yadadri Bhuvanagiri district in Telangana, India. It falls under the Choutuppal mandal. 

Villages in Nalgonda district